Conus excelsus, commonly known as the excelsior cone or illustrious cone, is a species of predatory sea snail, a marine gastropod mollusk in the family Conidae, the cone snails.

Shell description
The shell has a very high spire, with a size varying between 28 mm and 102 mm, compared to most cone shells, and thus it is exceptionally long relative to its width. This, and its overall rarity, makes it desirable to shell collectors. Its coloration consists of orangish to yellow pattern on a white background.

Distribution
Conus excelsus is an Indo-Pacific species found principally around the Philippines, but also as north as southern Japan and as far east as New Guinea and the Solomon Islands. it also occurs off Queensland, Australia

The species is rare but not endangered.

References 

 Brazier, J.W. 1894. A new Cone, Conus pulcherrimus Brazier, described from Tanna, New Hebrides. Proceedings of the Linnean Society of New South Wales 2 9: 189
 Sowerby, G. B., III. 1908. Description of a new species of the genus Conus. Annals and Magazine of Natural History, series 8, 1:465-466, fig. 95.
 Cotton, B.C. 1945. A Catalogue of the Cone Shells (Conidae) in the South Australian Museum. Records of the South Australian Museum (Adelaide) 8(2): 229-280
 Shikama, T. & Habe, T. 1968. A new Japanese cone, Turriconus nakayasui with reference to Embrikeana stupa group. Venus 26(3-4): 57-60
 Cernohorsky, W.O. 1974. The taxonomy of some Indo-Pacific Mollusca with description of a new species. Part 2. Records of the Auckland Institute and Museum 11: 121–142, 38 figs
 Cernohorsky, W.O. 1978. Tropical Pacific marine shells. Sydney : Pacific Publications 352 pp., 68 pls.
 Wilson, B. 1994. Australian Marine Shells. Prosobranch Gastropods. Kallaroo, WA : Odyssey Publishing Vol. 2 370 pp.
 Röckel, D., Korn, W. & Kohn, A.J. 1995. Manual of the Living Conidae. Volume 1: Indo-Pacific Region. Wiesbaden : Hemmen 517 pp.
 Puillandre N., Duda T.F., Meyer C., Olivera B.M. & Bouchet P. (2015). One, four or 100 genera? A new classification of the cone snails. Journal of Molluscan Studies. 81: 1-23

External links
http://www.coneshells-am.ru/ Cone Shells - Knights of the Sea

Gallery

excelsus
Gastropods described in 1908
Molluscs of the Philippines